The 2008 South Dakota Democratic presidential primary took place on June 3, 2008. Along with Montana, it was one of the final two elections in the 2008 primary season.  Senator Hillary Clinton won the primary, but on the same day, her opponent Barack Obama secured enough delegate votes for the 2008 Democratic National Convention to ensure his eventual nomination for President by the Democratic Party.

South Dakota has 66 counties with 762 election precincts.

Polling

A poll published April 3, 2008 indicated that Obama was supported by more respondents, 46%, than Clinton, who received the support of 34%. However, a May 31-June 1, 2008 poll by ARG projected a Clinton victory in South Dakota, with 60% of respondents supporting her versus 34% supporting Obama.

Results

Early on the day of the primary, hours before polls closed, the Associated Press projected Barack Obama's nomination for the presidency.  The projection was based on the declarations of a large number Democratic superdelegates, as well as exit polls of voters in South Dakota and Montana.  However, the AP calculated that Obama would be the Democratic nominee even if he lost the primaries in South Dakota and Montana.

See also
 2008 Democratic Party presidential primaries
 2008 South Dakota Republican presidential primary

References

South Dakota
2008 South Dakota elections
2008